Josephus Samuel Cecil (January 11, 1878 to August 20, 1940) was a United States Army officer who received the Medal of Honor for his actions during the Philippine–American War.

Cecil joined the Army in July 1898, and retired in July 1922.

Medal of Honor citation
Rank and Organization: First Lieutenant, 19th U.S. Infantry. Place and Date: At Bud-Dajo, Jolo, Philippine Islands, March 7, 1906. Entered Service At: New River, Tenn. Birth: New River, Tenn. Date of Issue: Unknown.

Citation:

While at the head of the column about to assault the first cotta under a superior fire at short range personally carried to a sheltered position a wounded man and the body of one who was killed beside him.

See also

 List of Medal of Honor recipients
 List of Philippine–American War Medal of Honor recipients

Notes

References
 Arlington National Cemetery
 

United States Army Medal of Honor recipients
United States Army officers
American military personnel of the Philippine–American War
1878 births
1940 deaths
People from Scott County, Tennessee
Philippine–American War recipients of the Medal of Honor